The 1997 German Formula Three Championship  was the 23rd edition of the German Formula Three Championship. It commenced on 26 April 1997 and ended on 15 October. Opel Team BSR driver Nick Heidfeld won the championship title after a title battle with Benetton RTL Junior's Timo Scheider.

Teams and drivers

Race calendar and results
 The series supported the ADAC events at all nine rounds. With the exception of round at Salzuburg in Austria, all rounds took place on German soil.

Championship standings

A-Class
Points are awarded as follows:

B-Class
Points are awarded as follows:

† — Drivers did not finish the race, but were classified as they completed over 90% of the race distance.

See also
1997 Masters of Formula 3

References

External links
 

German Formula Three Championship seasons
Formula Three
German Formula 3